Ligroin is the petroleum fraction consisting mostly of C7 and C8 hydrocarbons and boiling in the range 90‒140 °C (194–284 °F). The fraction is also called heavy naphtha. Ligroin is used as a laboratory solvent.  Products under the name ligroin can have boiling ranges as low as 60‒80 °C and may be called light naphtha. 

The name ligroin (or ligroine or ligroïne) appeared as early as 1866.

Standards 
Ligroin is assigned the CAS Registry Number 8032-32-4, which is also applied to many other products, particularly the lower boiling ones, called petroleum spirit, petroleum ether and petroleum benzine.

Use as fuel 
Ligroin was used to refuel the world's first production automobile, the Benz Patent-Motorwagen, on a long distance journey between Mannheim and Pforzheim. Bertha Benz added ligroin to the vehicle at a pharmacy in Wiesloch, making it the first filling station in history.

The first functional diesel engine could also run on ligroin.

See also 
 White spirit

References

Notes 

Hydrocarbon solvents
Petroleum products